This is a list of Malayalam films released in 1960 in chronological order.

Released films 
The following is a list of Malayalam films released in 1960

References

External links 
 Malayalam films of 1960 on  YouTube
 Malayalam films of 1960 at IMDb

Malayalam
Malayalam

1960